Normann Palace or County Government Palace is a building of County Government of Osijek-Baranja County in Osijek, Croatia.

History 

It was designed by Josip Vancaš and built from 1891 to 1894.

References 

Buildings and structures in Osijek
Palaces in Croatia
Josip Vancaš buildings
Government buildings completed in 1894
Art Nouveau architecture in Croatia
Art Nouveau government buildings
Tourist attractions in Osijek